|}
{| class="collapsible collapsed" cellpadding="0" cellspacing="0" style="clear:right; float:right; text-align:center; font-weight:bold;" width="280px"
! colspan="3" style="border:1px solid black; background-color: #77DD77;" | Also Ran

The 1983 Epsom Derby was the 204th annual running of the Derby horse race. It took place at Epsom Downs Racecourse on 1 June 1983.

The race was won by Eric Moller's Teenoso, at odds of 9/2 ridden by jockey Lester Piggott and trained at Newmarket by Geoff Wragg. Teenoso's win gave Piggott a record-breaking ninth success in the race. The winning time of 2:49.07 was the slowest of the 20th century.

Race details
 Sponsor: none
 Winner's prize money: £165,080
 Going: Soft
 Number of runners: 21
 Winner's time: 2 minutes, 49.07 seconds

Full result

Winner details
Further details of the winner, Teenoso:

 Foaled: 7 April 1980, in United Kingdom
 Sire: Youth; Dam: Furioso (Ballymoss)
 Owner: Eric Moller
 Breeder: White Lodge Stud

Form analysis

Two-year-old races
Notable runs by the future Derby participants as two-year-olds in 1982:
 Gordian – 3rd in Somerville Tattersall Stakes, 2nd in Dewhurst Stakes
 Lomond – 3rd in National Stakes
 Pluralisme – 1st in Prix des Chênes
 Shearwalk – 3rd in Seaton Delaval Stakes
 Slewpy – 1st in Young America Stakes
 The Noble Player – 2nd in Washington Singer Stakes, 3rd in Royal Lodge Stakes, 3rd in Grand Critérium

The road to Epsom
Early-season appearances in 1983 and trial races prior to running in the Derby:
 Carlingford Castle – 1st in Gallinule Stakes
 Gordian – 1st in Sandown Classic Trial
 Gun of Navarone – 3rd in Craven Stakes, 2nd in Dante Stakes
 Lomond – 1st in Gladness Stakes, 1st in 2000 Guineas, 2nd in Irish 2000 Guineas
 Morcon – 1st in Predominate Stakes
 Neorion – 2nd in Sandown Classic Trial
 Pluralisme – 1st in Prix de Guiche
 Salmon Leap – 1st in Tetrarch Stakes, 1st in Nijinsky Stakes
 Shearwalk – 1st in Heathorn Stakes, 2nd in Lingfield Derby Trial
 Slewpy – 3rd in Louisiana Derby
 Teenoso – 1st in Lingfield Derby Trial
 Tolomeo – 2nd in 2000 Guineas
 Wassl – 1st in Greenham Stakes, 1st in Irish 2000 Guineas
 Yawa – 3rd in Lingfield Derby Trial
 Zoffany – 1st in Feilden Stakes

Subsequent Group 1 wins
Group 1 / Grade I victories after running in the Derby.

 Slewpy – Meadowlands Cup (1983)
 Teenoso – Grand Prix de Saint-Cloud (1984), King George VI and Queen Elizabeth Stakes (1984)
 Tolomeo – Arlington Million (1983)
 Yawa – Grand Prix de Paris (1983), Premio Roma (1984)
 Zoffany – Hollywood Turf Cup (1985), Sunset Handicap (1986), San Luis Rey Handicap (1987)

Subsequent breeding careers

Leading progeny of participants in the 1983 Epsom Derby.

Sires of Classic winners
Lomond (16th)
 Marling – 1st Irish 1000 Guineas (1992)
 Dark Lomond – 1st Irish St. Leger (1988)
 Valanour – 1st Grand Prix de Paris (1995)
 Patrona – dam of Exceed And Excel
Tolomeo (9th) – Exported to Australia – Exported to Japan
 Innocent King – 1st Australian Derby (1993)
 Rain Burst – 3rd Fillies' Mile (1988)
 Daiwa Texas – 3rd Arima Kinen (2000)

Sires of Group/Grade One winners
Slewpy (18th)
 Thirty Slews – 1st Breeders' Cup Sprint (1992)
 Mr Nickerson – 3rd Vosburgh Stakes (1989)
 Helice – dam of Helissio
 Gift Of The Night – dam of Falbrav
Salmon Leap (4th)
 Bradawn Breever – 1st Phoenix Stakes (1991)
 Premier Amour – 3rd Prix de Diane (1989)
 Upward Trend – 1st Matron Stakes (1989)
 Farinella – Dam of Beef or Salmon
Morcon (8th) – Exported to New Zealand
 Solvit – 1st W. S. Cox Plate (1994)
Guns of Navarone (5th) – Exported to New Zealand
 Henderson Bay – 1st Sydney Cup (2002)

Sires of National Hunt horses
Teenoso (1st)
 Horus – 1st Edward Hanmer Memorial Chase (2004)
 Young Spartacus – 1st Mildmay of Flete Challenge Cup (2003)
 Her Honour – 2nd Long Distance Hurdle (1995)
 Young Buster – 1st September Stakes (1991)
Carlingford Castle (2nd)
 Inis Cara – 1st Paddy Power Handicap Chase (1999)
 Visible Difference – 1st Drinmore Chase (1993)
 Castle Mane – 1st Foxhunter Chase Challenge Cup (1999)
 Gretchen's Castle – Dam of Pandorama

Other Stallions
Wassl (14th) – Wiorno (1st Prix Dollar 1991), Ocean Falls (3rd Poule d'Essai des Poulains 1989), Anna Petrovna (dam of Annus Mirabilis)Zoffany (20th) – Clan Osullivan (2nd Golden Slipper Stakes 1992), Miss Zoe (3rd Australian Oaks 2000)The Noble Player (11th) – Tinte Blu (1st Premio Royal Mares 1991), Este (dam of Estejo)Pluralisme (7th) – Exported to Japan – Yamano Casablanca (2nd Oka Sho 1991)Shearwalk (3rd) – Exported to New Zealand – Exported to AustraliaGordian (10th) – Exported to BrazilYawa (Unseated) – Exported to Japan

References

External links
 Colour Chart – Derby 1983

Epsom Derby
Epsom Derby
Epsom Derby
Epsom Derby
 1983
20th century in Surrey